Phidias or Pheidias (Pheidias;  480 – 430 BC) was a Greek sculptor, painter, and architect. His Statue of Zeus at Olympia was one of the Seven Wonders of the Ancient World. Phidias also designed the statues of the goddess Athena on the Athenian Acropolis, namely the Athena Parthenos inside the Parthenon, and the Athena Promachos, a colossal bronze which stood between it and the Propylaea, a monumental gateway that served as the entrance to the Acropolis in Athens. Phidias was the son of Charmides of Athens. The ancients believed that his masters were Hegias and Ageladas.

Plutarch discusses Phidias' friendship with the Greek statesman Pericles, recording that enemies of Pericles tried to attack him through Phidias – who was accused of stealing gold intended for the Parthenon's statue of Athena, and of impiously portraying himself and Pericles on the shield of the statue. The historical value of this account, as well as the legend about accusations against the 'Periclean circle', is debatable, but Aristophanes mentions an incident with Phidias around that time.

Phidias is often credited as the main instigator of the Classical Greek sculptural design. Today, most critics and historians consider him one of the greatest of all ancient Greek sculptors.

Life and work 

Of Phidias' life little is known apart from his works. Although no original works exist that can be attributed to him with certainty, numerous Roman copies of varying degrees of fidelity are known to exist.

The earliest of Phidias' works were dedications in memory of Marathon, celebrating the Greek victory. His first commission was a group of national heroes with Miltiades as a central figure. At Delphi he created a great group in bronze including the figures of Greek gods Apollo and Athena, several Attic heroes, and General Miltiades the Younger. On the Acropolis of Athens, Phidias constructed a colossal bronze statue of Athena, the Athena Promachos, which was visible far out at sea. Athena was the goddess of wisdom and warriors and the protector of Athens. At Pellene in Achaea, and at Plataea, Phidias made two other statues of Athena, as well as a statue of the goddess Aphrodite in ivory and gold for the people of Elis.

In antiquity, Phidias was celebrated for his statues in bronze and his chryselephantine works (statues made of gold and ivory). In the Hippias Major, Plato claims that Phidias seldom, if ever, executed works in marble unlike many  sculptors of his time. Plutarch writes that he superintended the great works ordered by Greek statesman Pericles on the Acropolis. Ancient critics take a very high view of the merits of Phidias. They especially praise the ethos or permanent moral level of his works as compared with those of the later so called "pathetic" school. Both Pausanias and Plutarch mention works of his depicting the warlike Athena Areia. Demetrius calls his statues sublime, and at the same time precise.

In 447 BC, Pericles commissioned several sculptures for Athens from Phidias to celebrate the Greek victory against the Persians at the Battle of Marathon during the Greco-Persian Wars (490 BC). Pericles used some of the money from the maritime League of Delos, to rebuild and decorate Athens to celebrate this victory. Inscriptions prove that the marble blocks intended for the pedimental statues of the Parthenon were not brought to Athens until 434BC. It is therefore possible that most of sculptural decoration of the Parthenon was the work of Phidias' workshop including pupils of Phidias, such as Alcamenes and Agoracritus.

According to Pausanias (1.28.2), the original bronze Athena Lemnia was created by Phidias ( 450–440BC) for Athenians living on Lemnos. He described it as "the best of all Pheidias's works to see". Adolf Furtwängler suggested that he found a copy of the Athena Lemnia in a statue of which the head is located in Bologna and the body is at Dresden. Some 5th-centuryBC torsos of Athena have been found at Athens. The torso of Athena in the École des Beaux-Arts at Paris, which has lost its head, gives some idea of what the original statue may have looked like.

For the ancient Greeks, two works of Phidias far outshone all others: the colossal chryselephantine Statue of Zeus ( 432BC), which was erected in the Temple of Zeus at Olympia, and the Athena Parthenos (lit. "Athena the Virgin"), a sculpture of the virgin goddess Athena, which was housed in the Parthenon in Athens. Both sculptures belong to about the middle of the 5th century BC. A number of replicas and works inspired by it, both ancient and modern, have been made. Upon completing the Athena Parthenos, Phidias was accused of embezzlement. Specifically, he was charged with shortchanging the amount of gold that was supposed to be used for the statue and keeping the extra for himself. It seems that the charge was politically motivated a result of his friendship with Pericles, who had many enemies in Athens.

Phidias supposedly weighed the gold robe of the Athena Parthenos to prove his innocence, but was then accused of impiously portraying himself and Pericles on the shield of the statue, which was apparently true.

Plutarch records that Phidias was imprisoned and died in jail.

Aristophanes' play Peace mentions an unfortunate incident involving Phidias, but little context is provided.

According to Philochorus, as quoted by a scholiast on Aristophanes, Phidias was put to death by the Eleans after he completed the Statue of Zeus at Olympia for them.
From the late 5th century BC, small copies of the statue of Zeus were found on coins from Elis, which give a general notion of the pose and the character of the head. The god was seated on a throne, every part of which was used for sculptural decoration. His body was of ivory, his robe of gold. His head was of a somewhat archaic type; the bust of Zeus found at Otricoli, which used to be regarded as a copy of the head of the Olympian statue, is certainly more than a century later in style.

Archaeological discovery and legacy

A significant advancement in the knowledge of Phidias' working methodology came during 1954–58 with the excavation of the workshop at Olympia where he created the Statue of Zeus. Tools, terracotta molds and a cup inscribed on the bottom "Φειδίου εἰμί" (Pheidíou eimí) – "I belong to Phidias"; literally: "of Phidias I am", were found here, just where Pausanias said the statue was constructed. The discovery has enabled archaeologists to re-create the techniques used to make the statue and confirm its date.

By 1910, mathematician Mark Barr began using the Greek letter Phi (φ) as a symbol for the golden ratio after Phidias. However, Barr later wrote that he thought it unlikely that Phidias actually used the golden ratio.

Gallery

Namesake 
Phidias (crater)
4753 Phidias, a main-belt asteroid named after Phidias.

See also 
Ancient Greek sculpture 
Pediments of the Parthenon

References
Footnotes

Citations

Sources

Andrew Stewart, One Hundred Greek Sculptors: Their Careers and Extant Works, Part III of Stewart's Greek Sculpture, (Yale University Press).

External links 
 
 Phidias as a first name in the US

5th-century BC Athenians
5th-century BC Greek sculptors
Ancient Greek architects
Acropolis of Athens
Ancient Athenian sculptors
Ancient Greek sculptors